Local television in the United Kingdom, described in legislation as Local Digital Television Programme Services (L-DTPS), provides a television station for a specific local area. Successful applicants are awarded a sole licence for their chosen area, and are expected to locate their studios within the same area. They broadcast on the digital terrestrial (DTT) system, as used by the national Freeview service.

The independent regulator, Ofcom, invites applications in all areas where transmission is technically possible, and assesses proposals against the statutory criteria.

Availability
The multiplexes carrying the stations are operated by Comux, owned by the local TV broadcasters, with operations run by Canis Media.

In England and Northern Ireland, the local channels were on channel 8 and in Scotland and Wales they were originally given channel 45; however, after a number of channel closures, channel 23 was used. Following the closure of BBC Three, the local stations moved to channel 7 in England and Northern Ireland, and channel 8 in Scotland and Wales. Some local stations in England however are broadcast on Channel 8 for other reasons. Some stations are also available (in their local areas) via cable (Virgin Media) channel 159 and satellite (Sky) channel 117 (channel 134 in Wales because channel 117 is already occupied). Channels 168, 169 and 209 (previously 216) were used if a region wants multiple local TV channels on Sky before 1 May 2018.

Phase 1
In May 2012, Ofcom invited bids for local TV services in selected areas.

In August 2012, 57 applications were received to provide these services. Bristol, Brighton & Hove and Grimsby attracted only one bid each. Plymouth and Swansea received no bids from potential broadcasters.

† The owners of Birmingham licence City8 went into administration before the channel launched. The licence was re-awarded to another operator, Big Centre TV.

Phase 2
In March 2013, Ofcom announced that more areas had been selected to invite bids for local television services, in addition to re-advertising the previously un-awarded Swansea and Plymouth locations.

Local TV variations in 2021
As of February 2021, That's TV broadcast as a semi-national network (one which also uses the That's Christmas or That's New Year name over festive periods) with a local opt-out at 6pm for regional news, and a service streaming to the whole country via the VisionTV platform on channel 264 (which includes extra pop videos rather than the local news). Local Television Limited has nine licences in the United Kingdom, eight branded as Local TV operating as part as the Local Digital Television Programme, while the ninth – Manchester TV on the Greater Manchester multiplex – is separately licensed.

See also
 List of television stations in the United Kingdom
 Timeline of local television in the UK

References

External links
Indicative locations for local television multiplexes: Initial technical assessment
A new framework for local TV in the UK

Digital television in the United Kingdom